Walter Hagemeyer Burkholder (February 1, 1891– January 31, 1983) was an American plant pathologist who helped establish the role of bacteria as plant pathogens. He was awarded a Ph.D. by Cornell University in 1917 and subsequently appointed as professor of plant pathology.

In 1950 he first described the bacteria, Pseudomonas cepacia, later Burkholderia spp., responsible for causing sour skin disease in onions and colonising the rhizosphere of many plant species. Bacterial strains from the Burkholderia cepacia complex (Bcc) are opportunistic pathogens in humans with cystic fibrosis and have been implicated in vertebral osteomyelitis in intravenous drug abusers. This complex of at least 9 closely related species or genomovars is currently the focus of research because of their remarkable variability as plant and human pathogens, saprophytes, and biocontrol and bioremediation agents.

Burkholder was a member of the Society of American Bacteriologists.

References

External links
Annual Review of Microbiology
Annual Review of Phytopathology
Some bacteria can cross the line - Science News,  Oct 20, 2007 - Susan Milius
Is natural pesticide too hard on people? - Science News,  Nov 7, 1998 - S. Milius

Bibliography
Diseases and Insect and other Pests of the Field Bean in New York (Cornell Extension Bulletin. no. 58.) - Walter H. Burkholder, Cyrus Richard Crosby

Cornell University College of Agriculture and Life Sciences alumni
Cornell University faculty
American phytopathologists
1891 births
1977 deaths
20th-century agronomists